Tata Zambia Limited is a car dealer and commercial vehicle manufacturer based in Lusaka, Zambia. It is a subsidiary of Tata International Limited.

History 
Founded in 1977, the company was the first Tata subsidiary on the African continent. Already in 1992, Tata Zambia was run as a bus manufacturer.

In 2006, a manufacturing plant for buses and trucks was set up in Ndola. Bicycles are also produced there.

As part of diversification, the company has been involved in Pamodzi Hotels since 1997.

References

External links 
 

Tata Motors
Motor vehicle manufacturers of Zambia
Vehicle manufacturing companies established in 1977
1977 establishments in Zambia
Companies based in Lusaka